Marnab (also Romanized as Marnāb; also known as Maranū) is a village in Mavazekhan-e Sharqi Rural District, Khvajeh District, Heris County, East Azerbaijan Province, Iran. At the 2006 census, its population was 10, in 4 families.

References 

Populated places in Heris County